The Division of Longman is an Australian electoral division in Queensland.

History

The division was first proclaimed in 1994. The division is named after Irene Longman, the first female member of the Parliament of Queensland and the third woman elected to a parliament in Australia.

Wyatt Roy, who represented the electorate between 2010 and 2016, was Australia's youngest ever parliamentarian elected at the time.

Boundaries
Since 1984, federal electoral division boundaries in Australia have been determined at redistributions by a redistribution committee appointed by the Australian Electoral Commission. Redistributions occur for the boundaries of divisions in a particular state, and they occur every seven years, or sooner if a state's representation entitlement changes or when divisions of a state are malapportioned.

Longman covers much of the Moreton Bay Region, including the former Caboolture Shire and some of the former Pine Rivers.

Its boundaries include Beachmere, Bribie Island, Burpengary, Dakabin, Donnybrook, Kallangur, Ningi, Toorbul, Caboolture, Caboolture South, Morayfield, Wamuran, Woodford and Narangba.

Members

Election results

References

External links
 Division of Longman (Qld) — Australian Electoral Commission

Electoral divisions of Australia
Constituencies established in 1996
1996 establishments in Australia
Federal politics in Queensland